Live at the Royal Albert Hall is a live album released by English synth-pop duo Erasure in 2007. It is a double-CD set that is a recording of a concert appearance performed on 25 September 2007 at the Royal Albert Hall in London. This concert was a performance to promote the band's 2007 album Light at the End of the World. It was recorded and distributed in conjunction with Live Here Now and was available only through direct order and as a digital download via Live Here Now. Because of this limited availability, the album was ineligible for the UK Albums Chart.

A DVD of the same concert was released at the beginning of 2008 and got wider commercial release so that it charted at #7 in the UK music DVD chart and at #19 in the German music DVD chart.

CD track listing 
all songs written by Vince Clarke and Andy Bell

Disc one
 "Sunday Girl"				
 "Blue Savannah"		
 "Drama!" 				
 "I Could Fall in Love with You" 				
 "Fly Away"		
 "Breathe"				
 "Storm in a Teacup" 				
 "Chains of Love" 				
 "Breath of Life"
 "Love to Hate You"
 "Sucker for Love"
 "Jacques Cousteau"

Disc two
 "Victim of Love"				
 "When a Lover Leaves You"			
 "Ship of Fools" 				
 "Chorus"	
 "Sometimes"
 "A Little Respect"	
 "Oh L'Amour"				
 "Glass Angel"		
 "Stop!"

DVD track listing 

 DVD Released 7 April 2008

 "Sunday Girl"				
 "Blue Savannah"		
 "Drama!" 				
 "I Could Fall in Love with You" 				
 "Fly Away"		
 "Breathe"				
 "Storm in a Teacup" 				
 "Chains of Love" 				
 "Breath of Life"
 "Love to Hate You"
 "Sucker for Love"
 "Victim of Love"				
 "When a Lover Leaves You"			
 "Ship of Fools" 				
 "Chorus"	
 "Sometimes"
 "A Little Respect"	
 "Oh L'Amour"				
 "Glass Angel"		
 "Stop!"

Also includes a behind-the-scenes documentary

Erasure live albums
Albums produced by Gareth Jones (music producer)
Live albums recorded at the Royal Albert Hall
2007 live albums
Mute Records live albums
2008 video albums
Live video albums
2008 live albums
Mute Records video albums